Oberhofen bei Kreuzlingen is a village and former municipality in the canton of Thurgau, Switzerland.

In 1998 the municipality was merged with the neighboring municipality Illighausen to form a new and larger municipality Lengwil.

Former municipalities of Thurgau
Villages in Switzerland